The chapters of VS are written and illustrated by Keiko Yamada. It was serialized in Akita Shoten's shōjo magazine (aimed at teenage girls) Princess Comics. The individual chapters were released in 7 tankōbon volumes between June 1999 and December 24, 2001. The series is licensed in North America by CMX, which released the manga's 7 tankōbon volumes between April 1, 2006 and October 10, 2007.

Reiji Saioin, the top violinist in Hakuto Junior High School, is to be kicked out of the school if he does not win the next Japan National Music Contest due to his history of trouble. His private teacher and alum of Hakuto, Mitsuko Hane, is willing to help Reiji overcome his flaws to win the music contest. She wants Reiji to play the violin because she cannot due to her left arm being rendered useless after being burnt. Reiji has his own wishes to keep his sister, Miruka, who is abused by their father, happy. Along the way to win the music contest, Reiji becomes friends with Nachi Meiya, the best female violinist in Hakuto, and Aoi Kenzaki, a pianist-turned-violinist. He also has to deal with Bartholomew Asakura, the man who ruined Hane's arm, as well as his growing feelings for his teacher.



Volume listing

References

VS (manga)